Meydanak-e Kuchak (also Romanized as Meydānak-e Kūchak and Meydānak-e Kūchek; also known as Maidānak Pāīn, Meydānak-e Kychek, and Meydānak-e Pā’īn) is a village in Ashayer Rural District, in the Central District of Fereydunshahr County, Isfahan Province, Iran. At the 2006 census, its population was 185, in 33 families.

References 

Populated places in Fereydunshahr County